Goran Đukić or Djukić (born 6 November 1970) is a Bosnian Serb retired footballer.

Born in Banja Luka, SR Bosnia and Herzegovina, during his career he played for FK Borac Banja Luka, FK Hajduk Kula, FK Milicionar and Red Star Belgrade in the First League of FR Yugoslavia, and also with Austrian club SV Wörgl.

Honours
Borac Banja Luka
Mitropa Cup: 1992
Red Star Belgrade
Yugoslav Cup: 2002

References

External links
 Profile and stats at Srbijafudbal
 Interview at Borac B.Luka official website 

1970 births
Living people
Sportspeople from Banja Luka
Serbs of Bosnia and Herzegovina
Association football defenders
Yugoslav footballers
Bosnia and Herzegovina footballers
FK Borac Banja Luka players
FK Hajduk Kula players
FK Milicionar players
Red Star Belgrade footballers
SV Wörgl players
First League of Serbia and Montenegro players
Premier League of Bosnia and Herzegovina players
2. Liga (Austria) players
Bosnia and Herzegovina expatriate footballers
Expatriate footballers in Austria
Bosnia and Herzegovina expatriate sportspeople in Austria